Waimā is a community in the south Hokianga area of Northland, New Zealand. State Highway 12 runs through the area. The Waima River flows through the Waima Valley into the Hokianga Harbour. Rawene is to the north west, and Kaikohe is to the north east.

History and culture

Pre-European settlement

In 1810, an encounter at Waimā during the Musket Wars resulted in the death of the Ngā Puhi chief Te Tauroto. Te Whareumu was killed and Muriwai mortally wounded in a skirmish in March 1828.

The chief of the sub tribe Te Mahurehure and Te Urikaiwhare was Mohi Tawhai (d.1875), who was a signatory to the Treaty of Waitangi in 1840 and was known as the peace maker of the North.

European settlement
Waimā was the site of a Wesleyan mission in the mid-19th century. In the 1870s timber milling commenced in the area.

In 1898, people of Waimā refused to pay a tax on dogs, and marched on Rawene in the Dog Tax War.

Marae

Waimā has four Ngāpuhi marae. Moehau Marae, Ōtātara Marae and Ohinewai meeting house; and Tuhirangi Marae are affiliated with the hapū of Te Māhurehure. Te Raukura Marae is affiliated with both Te Māhurehure and Te Rauwera.

In October 2020, the Government committed $325,525 from the Provincial Growth Fund to upgrade Tuhirangi Marae, creating 1 jobs.

Demographics

Waima Forest had a population of 1,095 at the 2018 New Zealand census, an increase of 222 people (25.4%) since the 2013 census, and an increase of 66 people (6.4%) since the 2006 census. There were 318 households, comprising 585 males and 510 females, giving a sex ratio of 1.15 males per female. The median age was 34.3 years (compared with 37.4 years nationally), with 285 people (26.0%) aged under 15 years, 216 (19.7%) aged 15 to 29, 465 (42.5%) aged 30 to 64, and 129 (11.8%) aged 65 or older.

Ethnicities were 32.1% European/Pākehā, 82.5% Māori, 8.8% Pacific peoples, 2.7% Asian, and 0.3% other ethnicities. People may identify with more than one ethnicity.

The percentage of people born overseas was 5.5, compared with 27.1% nationally.

Although some people chose not to answer the census's question about religious affiliation, 38.9% had no religion, 38.1% were Christian, 12.1% had Māori religious beliefs, 0.3% were Buddhist and 2.5% had other religions.

Of those at least 15 years old, 66 (8.1%) people had a bachelor's or higher degree, and 210 (25.9%) people had no formal qualifications. The median income was $17,600, compared with $31,800 nationally. 33 people (4.1%) earned over $70,000 compared to 17.2% nationally. The employment status of those at least 15 was that 231 (28.5%) people were employed full-time, 108 (13.3%) were part-time, and 123 (15.2%) were unemployed.

Notable people

William Satchell, novelist and poet.

Education

Waima School, renamed to Te Kura O Waima, is a coeducational full primary (years 1–8) school and has a roll of  students as of  The school was founded in 1881. During the Dog Tax War of 1898, the government army of 120 men set up camp at Waima School.

Notes

External links

Photographs of Waima held in Auckland Libraries' heritage collections.

Hokianga
Populated places in the Northland Region